Setanta Records was a British independent record label led by founder Keith Cullen. Setanta published UK and Irish indie music in the late 1980s and in the 1990s.

History
Setanta Records was started in a Camberwell, London squat by former bicycle courier Keith Cullen. Their first success came when Dublin band Into Paradise received positive reviews from the British music press for their Setanta debut titled Under the Water. Major label interest followed and Into Paradise subsequently signed to Ensign Records retaining Cullen as band manager. Shortly thereafter, Cullen signed the Cork trio the Frank and Walters, who wore orange shirts and purple flared trousers. As with Into Paradise, the band signed to Go! Discs retaining Cullen as band manager. The Frank and Walters achieved minor commercial success when their song "After All" peaked at number 11 on the UK Singles Chart.

Commercial success followed Cullen's signing of the Divine Comedy whose first three albums Liberation, Promenade and Casanova were well received in the UK and Europe. The Divine Comedy also provided the soundtrack for the Channel 4 sitcom Father Ted. Despite label boss Cullen not thinking that the song was commercially promising, Setanta also had chart success with the Edwyn Collins (former frontman of Scotland's Orange Juice on Postcard Records) hit "A Girl Like You" which went on to become successful in several national charts.

In the late 1990s, the label turned down the Magnetic Fields' album 69 Love Songs, which ended up being a critical and commercial success. In 2007, Setanta signed London band The Tacticians.  Their debut album Some Kind of Urban Fulfilment was released on Setanta in August 2007. In 2012, Cullen announced that he was closing Setanta down.

Selected artists 
A House
Brian
Catchers
The Chalets
Evan Dando
The Divine Comedy
Edwyn Collins
Five Go Down to the Sea?
The Frank and Walters
Richard Hawley
Hem
Into Paradise
Mason Jennings
The Prayer Boat
Josh Ritter
Verbena
The Glee Club

Sources
Ireland's Hotpress Yearbook (2006)

References

External links
 Setanta Records homepage

British independent record labels
Indie rock record labels